The Cardinals–Rams rivalry is an American football rivalry between the National Football League (NFL)'s Arizona Cardinals and Los Angeles Rams. One of the oldest matchups in the league, the two teams met for the first time during the NFL's infancy in  back when the Cardinals were located in Chicago, and the Rams in Cleveland. State Farm Stadium and SoFi Stadium are only 375 miles apart, mostly along I-10. The Rams lead the series 48–40–2. The teams met twice in the playoffs, two Rams wins in the 1975 NFC Divisional Round and the 2021 NFC Wild Card Round. Both teams were also previously based in St. Louis and left to play in the Western United States.

History

Early Origins 
The Cardinals and Rams are some of the oldest surviving members of the National Football League; the Chicago Cardinals originally formed in 1898 and the Cleveland Rams were an expansion team that joined in 1936. Early on, both teams were pitted against each other in what was then the NFL Western division. Both clubs saw personnel struggles during World War II as neither team posted a winning season until 1944. The Rams and Cardinals would combine for 2 NFL Championships in 1945 and 1947 respectively, the latter being the most recent championship won by the Cardinals.

1950s & 60s 
After 1950, matchups between the two teams were not regular again until the division realignment in 2002. Rams then-owner Dan Reeves previously relocated the team to Los Angeles following the 1946 season, and the Cardinals would shift to the American Conference from 1950-52, before encountering financial difficulties throughout the 1950s, ultimately leading them to relocate to St. Louis in 1960 as part of a bid from the league to prevent an AFL team from taking the St. Louis market. The Cardinals would begin to struggle mightily through the decades following their lone championship in 1947 and would not make a playoff appearance until 1974.
Due to the shift in divisions and the reorganization following the merger with the AFL, the Rams and Cardinals only met 3 times between 1960 and 1968.

1970s 
The two franchises took very different paths during the 1970s. The Cardinals made back to back Divisional Round appearances in 1974 and 1975, while the Rams would made continuous postseason appearances from 1973 to 1979. These playoff appearances included a 1975 Divisional Round matchup against the Cardinals, the first postseason meeting between the two clubs.
The Rams defense scored 2 touchdowns in the first half while running back Lawrence McCutcheon ran for an NFL playoff record 202 yards on 37 carries. Los Angeles started the game off with a 79-yard scoring drive. The Cardinals were extremely outmatched against the Rams defense as quarterback Jim Hart threw a critical interception that was returned for a pick-6. Hart would finish the game with 3 interceptions as the Rams were well beyond out of reach. 

This would go onto be the Cardinals' last playoff appearance until 1982, and their last in a non-strike season until 1998, a decade after the franchise moved to Arizona. The two teams would meet again in the 1979 season, but the Rams dominated the game, shutting out the Cardinals 21–0.

The Rams were an aspiring playoff contender throughout the 1970s but would go onto lose in 4 straight Conference Championship games and lose an appearance in Super Bowl XIV.

1980s 
The Cardinals did not fare terribly well during the 1980s as the Rams would go onto boast a 6-game win streak in the series from 1979 to 1987. The Cardinals also would make their only playoff appearance of the decade during the 1982 postseason, but would fall to the Green Bay Packers. The Rams, meanwhile, were significantly competitive through the 1980s despite unstable ownership and a fight for the Los Angeles market with the Raiders relocating to LA in 1982. The Rams made 7 postseason appearances in the 1980s, but went on to lose twice in the conference championship to the 1985 Bears and the 1989 49ers. The Cardinals did not post a winning record from 1983 to 1998 and the club grew unsatisfied with the aging Busch Stadium, leading them to relocate to Phoenix, Arizona in 1988.

1990s 
The Rams sought relocation in 1995 following a sharp decline in fan attendance in addition to the team's play. Ironically, owner Georgia Frontiere relocated the team to St. Louis to fill the void left by the Cardinals 7 years earlier. The Cardinals struggled through most of the decade but somehow slipped into the playoffs in 1998 with a lowly 9–7 record, and pulled off a win over the Dallas Cowboys. However, they fell against the notorious Minnesota Vikings and their high-powered offense. The Rams pulled off an improbable turnaround the very next season: they finished 1998 with a weak 4–12 record, but turned their fortunes around during the 1999 season boasting a 13–3 record and winning Super Bowl XXXIV as the iconic Greatest Show On Turf led by Quarterback Kurt Warner.

2000s 
The new millennium fell in favor of the Rams briefly until they lost to the New England Patriots in Super Bowl XXXVI. The Cardinals were realigned back into the Rams’ division following the 2002 NFL season where they remain today. The Rams remained competitive briefly but never regained the levels of playoff success they experienced at the beginning of the decade as they would not make a playoff appearance from 2005 to 2016. The Cardinals also turned their own fortunes around later in the decade following the hiring of Ken Whisenhunt in 2007, and reached a high point for the franchise the following season by winning the NFC West and making their first super bowl appearance in franchise history, but fell to the Pittsburgh Steelers. Ironically, the Cardinals revived their playoff ambitions with former Rams Super Bowl winner and league MVP quarterback Kurt Warner. The Cardinals would only manage another wild card berth but would not return to the postseason until 2014; meanwhile, the Rams bottomed out with a terrible 1–15 record in 2009.

2010s 

Both teams entered the decade rebuilding. The Rams attempted to turn their team around with coach Jeff Fisher but would not prosper much beyond mediocre 7–9 records in 2013 and 2015 respectively. The Cardinals found themselves thriving again as general manager Steve Keim and Head Coach Bruce Arians brought them to a 10–6 record his first two seasons with the team, and led them to a playoff berth in 2014. The Cardinals also traded for quarterback Carson Palmer and see a renaissance of their offense as they went 13–3 and managed a trip to the 2015 NFC Championship, where they fell to the Carolina Panthers. Following the 2015 season, the Rams would relocate back to Los Angeles and take quarterback Jared Goff first overall in that year's draft. The Rams would post a poor 4–12 record their first season back in Los Angeles, but would go on to make the postseason with an 11-5 record following the hire of new head coach Sean McVay. During this time, the Rams would also manage to shut out the Cardinals during a game at London's Twickenham Stadium, the first shut-out the team experienced since 1992. The Cardinals sputtered to a 8–8 record, after which Carson Palmer and Bruce Arians retired. The team brought in Steve Wilks as their coach, though his tenure was very short and he was fired following the 2018 season. From 2017, the Rams swept the Cardinals in four consecutive seasons. 2018 also saw the Rams make a return to the Super Bowl for the first time since 2001, though they again fell to the New England Patriots. The Cardinals hired Texas Tech head coach Kliff Kingsbury to replace Keim at the start of the 2019 season, after which they drafted quarterback Kyler Murray first overall. The Rams also hit a slump that season following their Super Bowl appearance, and finished 9–7, missing the postseason.

2020s 
The beginning of the decade saw strong play by of both teams yet again. The 2020 season saw the Cardinals breakout to a 6-3 record by week 9, one game ahead of the Rams who were 5-3 at their bye week. However they would only manage to win the remaining 4 of 7 games due to two upset losses to the 49ers and the then-winless New York Jets, the Rams lost control of the division followed by losing another critical rivalry matchup, (and ultimately the division lead) to the Seattle Seahawks. Arizona would fare even worse as they lost 5 of 7 games to finish the season tied for the lowest remaining wild card spot with the Chicago Bears. Both teams met during week 17 in Los Angeles for their regular season finale, notably the Rams had benched starting quarterback Jared Goff due to a thumb injury, and were forced to start backup quarterback John Wolford. Despite a 7-0 lead to finish the first quarter; the Rams would go onto humiliate the Cardinals, scoring 18 unanswered points in a crushing defeat. The loss ultimately gave the remaining wild card spot to the Bears; eliminating the Cardinals.

The 2021 season started with several drastic changes for the Rams as they traded Jared Goff and several draft picks to Detroit for quarterback Matthew Stafford. The Cardinals started the season 7–0, including a 37–20 win over the Rams in Los Angeles, ending their 8 game win streak over Arizona. The Rams entered the Monday Night matchup in Arizona with an 8–4 record as Arizona boasted a 10–2 record. However, the Rams won the return game in Glendale 30–23 in a hard-fought battle that saw Kyler Murray throw two interceptions, one critically turning the ball over in the fourth quarter, allowing the Rams to take the lead and eventually win. The Rams came back to win the division, while the Cardinals fell to a Wild Card spot, with the two facing off in the Wild Card round of the playoffs.

During the Wild Card game, the Cardinals were again quickly outgunned by the Rams as they were outscored 21–0 by halftime. During the third quarter, Rams running back Cam Akers unintentionally collided with Cardinals safety Budda Baker during a run. Akers was unaware Baker had suffered a concussion and was unable to get back up and playfully taunted him following the play. Following the arrival of medical personnel, Akers expressed his regret for the celebration and tweeted an apology for his taunt and expressed his support for Baker's recovery after the game. Despite Murray’s best efforts during the second half, the Rams would go on to crush the Cardinals 34–11 in the Cardinals' first postseason appearance since 2015 and eventually win Super Bowl LVI.

Game results

|-
| 
| style="| 
| style="| Cardinals  6–0
| style="| Cardinals  13–7
| Cardinals  2–0
| Rams join the NFL as an expansion team 
|-
| 
| style="| 
| style="| Cardinals  7–6
| style="| Cardinals  31–17
| Cardinals  4–0
|
|-
| 
| style="| 
| style="| Rams  14–0
| style="| Rams  24–0
| Cardinals  4–2
|
|-

|-
| 
| Tie 1–1
| style="| Rams  26–14
| style="| Cardinals  17–7
| Cardinals  5–3
| 
|-
| 
| Tie 1–1
| style="| Cardinals  7–0
| style="| Rams  10–6
| Cardinals  6–4
|
|-
| 
| Tie 1–1
| style="| Rams  7–3
| style="| Cardinals  7–0
| Cardinals  7–5
| 
|-
| 
| style="| 
| style="| Rams  21–0
| style="| Rams  35–21
| Tied  7–7
| Rams win 1945 NFL Championship Game.
|-
| 
| Tie 1–1
| style="| Rams  17–14
| style="| Cardinals  34–10
| Tied  8–8
| The Rams would relocate to Los Angeles at the end of the year. First meeting in Los Angeles Memorial Coliseum.
|-
| 
| Tie 1–1
| style="| Rams  27–7
| style="| Cardinals  17–10
| Tied  9–9
| Cardinals win 1947 NFL Championship Game, their most recent championship as of 2022
|-
| 
| style="| 
| style="| Cardinals  27–24
| style="| Cardinals  27–22
| Cardinals  11–9
|
|-
| 
| style="| 
| style="| Cardinals  31–27
| Tie  28–28
| Cardinals  12–9–1
|
|-

|-
| 
| style="| Rams  45–21
| Los Angeles Memorial Coliseum
| Cardinals  12–10–1
| Rams win 1951 NFL Championship Game.
|-
| 
| Tie  24–24
| Comiskey Park
| Cardinals  12–10–2
| 
|-
| 
| style="| Rams  35–24
| Los Angeles Memorial Coliseum
| Cardinals  12–11–2
|
|-
| 
| style="| Rams  28–17
| Comiskey Park
| Tied  12–12–2
| 
|-

|-
| 
| style="| Cardinals  43–21
| Los Angeles Memorial Coliseum
| Cardinals  13–12–2
| Cardinals' First Season in St. Louis following relocation from Chicago
|-
| 
| style="| Rams  27–3
| Sportsman's Park
| Tied  13–13–2
| First and final meeting in Sportsman's Park.
|-
| 
| style="| Rams  24–13
| Busch Stadium
| Rams  14–13–2
| Rams take lead in the series for the first time. Final matchup before the NFL-AFL merger. First meeting in Busch Stadium.
|-

|-
| 
| style="| Rams  34–12
| Los Angeles Memorial Coliseum
| Rams  15–13–2
| AFL-NFL merger. Rams moved to the NFC West and Cardinals moved to the NFC East where they remained through .
|-
| 
| style="| Cardinals  24–14
| Busch Stadium
| Rams  15–14–2
| 
|- style="background:#f2f2f2; font-weight:bold;"
|  1975 Playoffs
| style="| 
| Los Angeles Memorial Coliseum
| Rams  16–14–2
|  NFC Divisional. First playoff meeting between the two teams.
|-
| 
| style="| Cardinals  30–28
| Los Angeles Memorial Coliseum
| Rams  16–15–2
| 
|-
| 
| style="| Rams  21–0
| Los Angeles Memorial Coliseum
| Rams  17–15–2
| Final meeting at Los Angeles Memorial Coliseum until 2016. Rams lose Super Bowl XIV.
|-

|-
| 
| style="| Rams  21–13
| Busch Stadium
| Rams  18–15–2
| 
|-
| 
| style="| Rams  16–13
| Busch Stadium
| Rams  19–15–2
| 
|-
| 
| style="| Rams  46–14
| Anaheim Stadium
| Rams  20–15–2
| First meeting in Anaheim Stadium
|-
| 
| style="| Rams  35–24
| Busch Stadium
| Rams  21–15–2
|
|-
| 
| style="| Rams  16–10
| Busch Stadium
| Rams  22–15–2
| Cardinals' Final season in St. Louis before relocating to Phoenix. Final meeting in Busch Stadium
|-
| 
| style="| Cardinals  41–27
| Anaheim Stadium
| Rams  22–16–2
|
|-
| 
| style="| Rams  37–14
| Anaheim Stadium
| Rams  23–16–2
|
|-

|-
| 
| style="| Cardinals  24–14
| Anaheim Stadium
| Rams  23–17–2
| 
|-
| 
| style="| Cardinals  20–14
| Anaheim Stadium
| Rams  23–18–2
| 
|-
| 
| style="| Cardinals  38–10
| Sun Devil Stadium
| Rams  23–19–2
| First meeting in Sun Devil Stadium.
|-
| 
| style="| Rams  14–12
| Anaheim Stadium
| Rams  24–19–2
| Rams' final season in Southern California until 2016. Final meeting in Anaheim Stadium
|-
| 
| style="| Cardinals  31–28(OT)
| Sun Devil Stadium
| Rams  24–20–2
|
|-
| 
| style="| Cardinals  20–17
| Trans World Dome
| Rams  24–21–2
| First meeting in Trans World Dome (now known as The Dome at America's Center).
|-

|-
| 
| style="| 
| style="| Rams  27–14
| style="| Rams  30–28
| Rams  26–21–2
| Cardinals move to the NFC West as a result of NFL realignment.
|-
| 
| style="| 
| style="| Rams  37–13
| style="| Rams  30–27(OT)
| Rams  28–21–2
| 
|-
| 
| Tie 1–1
| style="| Rams  17–10
| style="| Cardinals  31–7
| Rams  29–22–2
| 
|-
| 
| Tie 1–1
| style="| Cardinals  38–28
| style="| Rams  17–12
| Rams  30–23–2
| 
|-
| 
| Tie 1–1
| style="| Cardinals  34–20
| style="| Rams  16–14
| Rams  31–24–2
| 
|-
| 
| style="| 
| style="| Cardinals  34–31
| style="| Cardinals  48–19
| Rams  31–26–2
| 
|-
| 
| style="| 
| style="| Cardinals  34–13
| style="| Cardinals  34–10
| Rams  31–28–2
| Cardinals lose Super Bowl XLIII with former Rams' MVP Quarterback Kurt Warner
|-
| 
| style="| 
| style="| Cardinals  21–13
| style="| Cardinals  31–10
| Rams  31–30–2
| 
|-

|-
| 
| Tie 1–1
| style="| Cardinals  17–13
| style="| Rams  19–6
| Rams  32–31–2
| 
|-
| 
| style="| 
| style="| Cardinals  23–20
| style="| Cardinals  19–13(OT)
| Cardinals  33–32–2
| 
|-
| 
| style="| 
| style="| Rams  17–3
| style="| Rams  31–17
| Rams  34–33–2
| 
|-
| 
| Tie 1–1
| style="| Rams  27–24
| style="| Cardinals  30–10
| Rams  35–34–2
| 
|-
| 
| style="| 
| style="| Cardinals  12–6
| style="| Cardinals  31–14
| Cardinals  36–35–2
| 
|-
| 
| Tie 1–1
| style="| Cardinals  27–3
| style="| Rams  24–22
| Cardinals  37–36–2
| Rams' Final Season in St. Louis before relocating back to Los Angeles
|-
| 
| Tie 1–1
| style="| Cardinals  44–6
| style="| Rams  17–13
| Cardinals  38–37–2
| Rams return to the Los Angeles Memorial Coliseum in LA. Rams draft Jared Goff.
|-
| 
| style="| 
| style="| Rams  33–0
| style="| Rams  32–16
| Rams  39–38–2
| 
|-
| 
| style="| 
| style="| Rams  34–0
| style="| Rams  31–9
| Rams  41–38–2
| Rams lose Super Bowl LIII.
|-
| 
| style="| 
| style="| Rams  31–24
| style="| Rams  34–7
| Rams  43–38–2
| Cardinals draft Kyler Murray.
|-

|-
| 
| style="| 
| style="| Rams  18–7
| style="| Rams  38–28
| Rams  45–38–2
| No fans in attendance for either game due to COVID-19 pandemic. Rams open SoFi Stadium in Inglewood. With the Rams win against Cardinals to clinch their playoff berth, Arizona was eliminated from the playoffs, allowing the Chicago Bears to qualify instead.
|-
| 
| Tie 1–1
| style="| Cardinals  37–20
| style="| Rams  30–23
| Rams  46–39–2
| Rams trade Jared Goff for Matthew Stafford. Rams win Super Bowl LVI.
|-
|- style="background:#f2f2f2; font-weight:bold;"
|  2021 Playoffs
| style="| 
| style="| Rams  34–11
|
|  Rams  47–39–2
|  NFC Wild Card.
|-
| 
| Tie 1–1
| style="| Cardinals  27–17
| style="| Rams  20–12
| Rams  48–40–2
|
|-

|-
| Regular season
| style="|
| Cardinals 23–22
| Rams 24–17–2
| Rams 1–0 in London (officially a Rams home game). Teams have tied twice, both times at Chicago.
|-
| Postseason
| style="|
| Rams 2–0
| no games
| NFC Divisional Game: 1975; NFC Wild Card Game: 2021
|-
| Regular and postseason
| style="|
| Rams 24–23
| Rams 24–17–2
|-

See also
 Governor's Cup (Missouri)

References

General

Specific

National Football League rivalries
Arizona Cardinals
Los Angeles Rams
Los Angeles Rams rivalries
Arizona Cardinals rivalries